Mem Morrison, born as Mehmet Muhaurem Ramadan,
 is a British performance artist. His work draws upon personal complexities by acknowledging cultural differences.

Biography
Morrison was born in south-east London to Turkish Cypriot parents.  He changed his name as a young actor whilst seeking work. He has stated that "At that time Muhaurem was the past and Morrison was who I wanted to be...But I feel that I let my community down by changing it, and if I was starting out now as an actor I probably wouldn't change it. There is much more acceptance now."

Productions
1997: Push
1998: Showroom
2000: Lilac
2000: Triptych
2004: Undo
2004: Fuel
2007: Tebrik
2007: Leftovers 
2009: Ringside

References

External links
Official website

Living people
British performance artists
Artists from London
British people of Turkish Cypriot descent
Year of birth missing (living people)